Cecil Gray (28 April 1902 – 26 September 1990) was an Australian cricketer. He played in three first-class matches for South Australia between 1921 and 1923.

See also
 List of South Australian representative cricketers

References

External links
 

1902 births
1990 deaths
Australian cricketers
South Australia cricketers
Cricketers from Adelaide